Myrmecia potteri is an Australian ant which belongs to the genus Myrmecia. This species is native to Australia. Myrmecia potteri is mainly distributed and commonly observed in the eastern states of Australia.

The size for a worker Myrmecia potteri is around 12-13 millimetres long. It is primarily black. Mandibles, antennae, legs, and several other features are brown. The tarsi is a lighter and more yellowish-brown colour.

References

Myrmeciinae
Hymenoptera of Australia
Insects described in 1951
Insects of Australia